Parornix texanella is a moth of the family Gracillariidae. It is known from Texas, United States.

References

Parornix
Moths of North America
Moths described in 1906